The spotted steed (Hemibarbus maculatus) is a species of small freshwater fish in the family Cyprinidae. It is found throughout the Amur basin in eastern Asia to China, the Korean peninsula, and Japan. Currently, little research has been done regarding this species, therefore, information regarding it is limited. The common name of this freshwater fish is the spotted steed. Its scientific name is Hemibarbus maculatus. Hemibarbus is from ancient Greek and means "half". Maculatus, is Latin and means "spotted".

Taxonomy and classification 
The spotted steed belongs to the kingdom Animalia, the phylum Chordata, and the class Actinopterygii. Further, it belongs to the order Cypriniformes, and the subfamily Gobioninae.

Identification and characteristics 
The spotted steed can be distinguished from other similar species through various physical and behavioral characteristics. The spotted steed exhibits 7-11 large blackish spots on each flank, under developed lips, and fins placed in a specific order. Specifically, their dorsal fin is closer to the tip of their snout than their caudal-fin base. Also, they have six and a half branched anal-fin rays.

Diet 
The spotted steed is known to feed on benthic crustaceans, insects and mollusks. They have been recorded to feed mainly on mollusks during the summer and crustaceans during the winter.

Reproduction and lifecycle 
The spotted steed becomes mature at 3 years of age. They naturally breed during May and June. Their eggs are deposited among aquatic vegetation and develop in approximately four days. Then, the larvae live in the pelagic stage for their first six days of life.

Native range 
The spotted steed is native to China, Korea, Japan and the Amur basin.

Non-native range 
The spotted steed was first introduced to the former USSR accidentally. It is believed to have invaded the freshwater habitats of some lakes and rivers in the Russian Federation and Russian Far East. The invasion was likely the result of the species accidentally being introduced with Chinese carp fry from the Yangtze River, China in 1988.

Current distribution 
Some countries the species is found in includes Cambodia, China, Chongqing, Guanxi, Guizhou, Hebei, Heilongjang, Henan, Hubei, Hunan, Jiangsu, Jiangxi, Nei Menggu, Shanghai, Sichuan, Yunnan, Zhejiang, Japan, Korea, Laos, Mongolia, Taiwan, Uzbekistan, and Vietnam. Specifically, in Mongolia, the species is widely distributed in Lake Buir and Rivers Onon, Kherlen, and Khalkhiin. Outside of Mongolia, the species is distributed throughout the Amur and Yangtze drainage (Russia, China) and Taiwan. Some of the European areas it has been accidentally introduced into include the Russian Federation and Russian Far East.

Modes of distribution and introduction 
The main mode of distribution of this species has been through accidental introduction. Specifically, the introduction occurred indirectly when Chinese carp fry was purposely introduced from Yangtze River to the former USSR. Another mode of distribution the species has used to invade other habitats is that it was intentionally introduced in rivers of various Asian countries. Lastly, throughout most of Asia, natural dispersal has occurred; this is especially true in China, Korea, Japan, and countries connected by the Amur River basin.

Ecological role 
The spotted steed has been recorded to be a serious competitor and threat to the native benthic fish where it is introduced. This was especially true when it was introduced into the former USSR. Some impacts this species has had on habitats include causing habitat alteration, modification of natural benthic communities, negatively impacting aquaculture and fisheries, causing a reduction in native biodiversity, and engaging in competition with native species. The spotted steed is an excellent invader due to its rapid growth rate and higher fecundity than native fish species. Within its native ecosystem it engages in competition, however, it does not have as strong of an effect on other species as it does in the habitats it invades.

Factors in establishment 
Some factors that are known to influence the successful establishment of the spotted steed are its high fecundity and rapid growth rate. The species also has a very non-specific diet that consists of snails, aquatic insects, clams, and small fish. As such, it is able to obtain its resources easier than other species with more specific diets. These factors aid in the species ability to invade other habitats.

Benefits and threats 
The spotted steed threatens its newly established habitat by harming aquaculture and fisheries, reducing native biodiversity, and causing loss of native species. It benefits the newly established habitat by becoming a part of the food chain and acting as a food source/prey to larger predators.

Control methods and status of mitigation 
There is currently not an active control program for this species. Therefore, the status of mitigation is “no action".

References

 

Hemibarbus
Fish described in 1871